Stubenberg, called  Stubenberg am See, is a municipality in the district of Hartberg-Fürstenfeld, in Styria, Austria. It is located roughly 50 km from Graz and 200 km from Vienna. It has a population of 2.287 as of April 2010.

Emblem 
The emblem of Stubenberg shows ideas of the emblem of the noble family of Stubenberg, which was named after the castle located within the area of Stubenberg.  The toppled anchor resembles the silvery Wolfsangel of the emblem of the nobles; the background was replaced though, showing the green-white colors of Styria now.

Geography 
Stubenberg is located in the valley of Feistritz, on the south-east of the Alps. The municipality extends between 386 to 1282 meters above sea level.

Climate
Due to its position southeast of the Alps, Stubenberg is shielded from the prevailing westerly winds that bring weather fronts in from the North Atlantic to northwestern and central Europe.

Districts
Stubenberg is divided into 5 districts. They are:
 Buchberg, 452 ha (231 inhabitants)
 Freienberg, 544 ha (293 inhabitants)
 Stubenberg, 789 ha (622 inhabitants)
 Vockenberg, 630 ha (440 inhabitants)
 Zeil-Stubenberg, 841 ha (670 inhabitants)

Neighbouring municipalities
The following villages border Stubenberg (starting from north): 
 Rabenwald
 Schönegg bei Pöllau
 Tiefenbach bei Kaindorf
 Sankt Johann bei Herberstein
 Siegersdorf bei Herberstein
 Puch bei Weiz
 Floing

Population

Population development
Since the first census 1869, resulting in 1,772 inhabitants, the number of inhabitants did rise almost year-to-year (with a sharp decline of 4.9% from 1934 to 1939) up to 2,325. Reaching a peak in 1991 the most recent number (2010) is slightly down, at 2,287.

Religions 
The vast majority (95.4%) of the inhabitants are members of the Catholic Church; 0.8% belong to the Protestantism and about 0.4% are attributed to Islam. 2.1% of the inhabitants do not belong to any religious group.
A Roman Catholic parish is located in Stubenberg.

Economy 
A major source of income for Stubenberg is tourism, mainly in the summer season. The village can account for more than 150 thousand overnight stays. In addition, many visitors take day trips to Stubenberg, especially to its lake providing water sports facilities or to Schloss Herberstein. 
There is no industrial production located in the vicinity, small companies mainly provide for local demand. 14 percent of persons employed are within the agricultural sector. The service sector dominates with 52%.

Stubenberg hosted the 1986 European Hot Air Balloon Championships, at the grounds of Schloss Schielleiten.  The balloon event was held there again in 1996.

Main sights

 Schloss Stubenberg (16th century), home of a hotel and a taverne and hosting cultural events
 Schloss Schielleiten, late-baroque, home of a state-owned sports-school with extended sports fields (tennis, soccer, athletics)
 Altschielleiten, ruin near castle Schielleiten
 Stubenberg is located near the Styrian Schlösserstraße and the Styrian Apfelstraße
 Lake Stubenberg, an artificial lake, with different recreational facilities
 Tier- und Naturpark Schloss Herberstein with Schloss Herberstein
 Castle Neuhaus

References

Cities and towns in Hartberg-Fürstenfeld District